Altınordu (literally "Golden horde") is a Turkish name that may refer to:
 Golden Horde, a medieval empire
 Altınordu, Ordu, a planned district in Ordu Province
 Altınordu S.K., a sports club in İzmir
 Altınordu İdman Yurdu SK, a defunct sports club in İstanbul